Whalsay Airstrip is located at the village of Skaw in the northern end of the island of Whalsay, Shetland, Scotland. It is the only airfield serving the island and is available for charter flights.

Notes

References
 Shetland Islands Council (2010) "Shetland in Statistics 2010" (pdf) Economic Development Unit. Lerwick. Retrieved 6 March 2011.

External links
 Gazetteer for Scotland entry

Airports in Shetland
Whalsay